Edi Kurniawan (born January 7, 1988 in Lampung) is an Indonesian weightlifter. He dominated the 69 kg class by winning the gold medal at the 2007 Southeast Asian Games in Bangkok, Thailand.

Kurniawan represented Indonesia at the 2008 Summer Olympics in Beijing, where he competed for the men's lightweight category. He placed twelfth in this event, as he successfully lifted 135 kg in the snatch, and hoisted 172 kg from his third and final attempt in the clean and jerk, for a total of 307 kg.

References

External links
NBC 2008 Olympics profile

Indonesian male weightlifters
1988 births
Living people
Olympic weightlifters of Indonesia
Weightlifters at the 2008 Summer Olympics
Sportspeople from Lampung
Southeast Asian Games gold medalists for Indonesia
Southeast Asian Games bronze medalists for Indonesia
Southeast Asian Games medalists in weightlifting
Competitors at the 2007 Southeast Asian Games
20th-century Indonesian people
21st-century Indonesian people